Rhynchospora chalarocephala, known by the common name of loosehead beaksedge, is a member of the sedge family, Cyperaceae. It is a perennial herb, found throughout the southeastern and Mid-Atlantic United States, from New Jersey to Texas.

References

External links

chalarocephala
Flora of the Eastern United States
Flora of the Southeastern United States
Plants described in 1940